The 1987–88 Eliteserien season was the 31st season of ice hockey in Denmark. Seven teams participated in the league, and Esbjerg IK won the championship. Gladsaxe SF was relegated to the 1. division.

First round

Final round
The top 4 teams from the first round qualified for the final round. Esbjerg IK finished first in the final round.

External links
Season on eliteprospects.com

Dan
1987-88
1987 in Danish sport
1988 in Danish sport